Wilma Landkroon (born 28 April 1957, Enschede) is a Dutch pop singer. At eleven  years old, her first top chart success in the Netherlands and Germany was in 1968 the song “Heintje, bau ein Schloss für mich”.

After this, she had many successes in Netherlands and Germany during the years 1969 and 1970 (see Discography). When Klaus Lorenzen became new producer of the young singer, she started to record songs in different languages (including English and Japanese), and had international chart successes (“Tulips from Amsterdam”; “Lavender blue”). After 1971, Wilma was a star only in the Netherlands, and some years later she became nearly forgotten.

In 2003, a CD with old and new songs of her was produced (“Wilma –- toen en nu”, which means "Wilma – Then and Now"). In the song “Gouden platen – volle zalen” (Golden Records – Full Halls) she gives a melancholy review on her life as one of the most successful child stars of all time. She decided to try another comeback in 2009, and recorded (with Sylvia Corpiér) a duet, "Niets of Niemand". The song was ranked No. 1 in Holland FM Top 25 at the end of August 2009. She is the younger sister of singer Reiny Landkroon and singer-songwriter Henny Thijssen.

Discography (Dutch) (selected)

Singles
1968 Heintje, baue ein Schloss für mich (German)
1969 Toverfee
1969 80 rode rozen
1969 Een klomp met een zeiltje
1969 Grootpappa
1970 Huil toch niet als je weg moet gaan
1970 'n Suikerspin
1971 Zou het erg zijn (with Pierre Kartner)
1971 Ik heb een vraag (with Pierre Kartner)
1971 Schenkt man sich Rosen in Tirol (with John van Kesteren)  (German)
1972 Gebeurtenissen
1972 Waarom laat iedereen mij zo alleen
1973 Michael (with De Makkers)
2009 Niets of Niemand (with Sylvia Corpiér)

Albums
1969 Wilma
1969 Wilma's Kerstfeest
1970 Veel liefs van...
1971 Zou het erg zijn lieve opa
1993 De 34 beste van Wilma
2003 Wilma - toen en nu
2004 Wilma - Dubbelgoud = Dubbelgoed (Dutch - German)

References

1957 births
Living people
Dutch women singers
People from Enschede